A 1915 marble statue of Abraham Lincoln by Antonio Frilli is installed in Ashland, Oregon's Lithia Park, in the United States. The statue was gifted to the city by Gwin S. Butler, who dedicated the artwork as a memorial to his stepfather, pioneer Jacob Thompson, in 1916.

Description
The statue is a standing figure of Lincoln with books stacked on his proper left foot. He wears an unbuttoned coat and holds a scroll in his proper right hand. The marble sculpture measures approximately 5 x 2 x 1 1/3 ft and rests on a granite base measuring approximately 4 ft, 4 in tall. One bronze plaque reads:

Another reads:

History
The statue was created in 1915. It was originally installed near Butler-Perozzi Fountain and was later relocated to the Oregon Shakespeare Festival and eventually Lithia Park. It has been vandalized several times, including in 1958 and the beheading of the statue in 1967. The artwork was surveyed as part of the Smithsonian Institution's "Save Outdoor Sculpture!" program in 1993. It was beheaded once again in 2008 and removed from the park for repairs.

See also

 1915 in art
 Memorials to Abraham Lincoln

References

External links

 Statue of Abraham Lincoln – Ashland, OR at Waymarking

1915 sculptures
Outdoor sculptures in Ashland, Oregon
Marble sculptures in Oregon
Monuments and memorials in Oregon
Monuments and memorials to Abraham Lincoln in the United States
Relocated buildings and structures in Oregon
Sculptures of men in Oregon
Statues in Oregon
Ashland, Oregon
Vandalized works of art in Oregon